Buhoma is a genus of snakes in the superfamily Elapoidea. The genus is endemic to Africa.

It was formerly classified in the family Lamprophiidae, but following the split of that family, the taxonomic placement of Buhoma remains uncertain.

Species
Three species are recognized as being valid.
Buhoma depressiceps  – pale-headed forest snake
Buhoma procterae  – Uluguru forest snake 
Buhoma vauerocegae  – Usambara forest snake

Nota bene: A binomial authority in parentheses indicates that the species was originally described in a genus other than Buhoma.

References

Alethinophidia
Snake genera
Snakes of Africa
Taxa named by Wolfgang Böhme (herpetologist)
Taxa named by Frank Glaw
Taxa named by Miguel Vences
Taxa named by Thomas Ziegler (zoologist)